Tyler Bass (born February 14, 1997) is an American football placekicker for the Buffalo Bills of the National Football League (NFL). He played college football at Georgia Southern and was drafted by the Bills in the sixth round of the 2020 NFL Draft.

High school career 
Bass played high school football and soccer at Dutch Fork High School in Irmo, South Carolina. He credits his grandma — or “meemaw” — for convincing him to try out for the football team due to his strong soccer leg. He committed to Georgia Southern on January 31, 2015. He won the Chris Sailer award, awarded to the best high school football kicker, following his senior season.

College career 
Bass was redshirted his true freshman year. He saw significant improvement in his redshirt junior season, making 19 of 21 field goal attempts and 45 of 45 extra point attempts. During his last game at Georgia Southern, he began his practice of wearing eye black under only one eye as a shoutout to his grandmother.

He participated in the 2020 Senior Bowl, making 2 field goals and 4 of 4 extra point attempts.

Professional career

2020 season 
The Buffalo Bills selected Bass in the sixth round, 188th overall, of the 2020 NFL Draft. Bills special teams coordinator Heath Farwell revelated that he was still in Georgia during the COVID-19 pandemic and was able to attend Bass’s pre-draft workout when other pro days were being canceled.

Bass signed a four-year, $3.475 million contract with the Bills on May 7, 2020. He then gained national attention after posting practice videos of him kicking a 50-yard field goal without taking a single step toward the football and a 60-yard field goal with only one step.

During a shortened training camp, Bass beat out incumbent placekicker Stephen Hauschka to gain the starting position, with the Bills cutting Hauschka on August 27, 2020. Bass drove two and a half hours from South Carolina to Birmingham, Alabama for weekly training sessions with the team's long snapper and holder.

During his professional debut against the New York Jets on September 13, 2020, Bass completed all three of his extra point attempts, but was 2 for 4 on field goal attempts. His first attempt, from 38 yards out, was subject to controversy as the ball appeared to have sailed above the upright, but was discounted. He then missed his second attempt from 34 yards before connecting from 22 and 19 yards. Bass made his next four field goal attempts over the next five games, including a 48-yarder against the Kansas City Chiefs in week 6, before missing on a 52-yard attempt in the same game. In the rematch against the Jets, Bass completed 6 of 8 field goal attempts, including a new career-long 53-yard attempt, scoring the only points of the game for Buffalo as the team won 18–10. Bass set several franchise records in that game, including the most field goal attempts attempted by a Bills kicker in one game.

After making three of four field goals against the Seattle Seahawks in week 9 (with his lone miss being a 61-yard attempt), Bass converted all three of his field goal attempts against the Arizona Cardinals, with all of them being longer than 54 yards and his longest being 58 yards out. Bass became the first kicker in Bills history to make three field goals longer than 50 yards in one game, and just the second kicker in NFL history to make 3 field goals longer than 54 yards in the same game (the other being Kris Brown in 2007).

Bass converted 28 of his 34 field goal attempts and 57 of his 59 extra points, totaling 141 points. His 141 points broke Steve Christie's 1998 franchise-record of 140 points in a single season. He also broke Scott Norwood's franchise records of extra points attempted and made in a single season.

2021 season 
Bass was named AFC Special Teams Player of the Month for October 2021, making all of his extra point attempts while also converting all 10 of his field goal attempts.

Records and achievements

NFL records 
 Longest field goal in NFL playoff history by a rookie: 54 yards (2020)

Bills franchise records 
 Most field goals attempted in a game: 8 (Week 7, 2020)
 Most field goals made in a game: 6, shared with Steve Christie (Week 7, 2020, Week 11, 2022)
 Most points scored in a single season: 141 (2020)

References

External links
Buffalo Bills bio
Georgia Southern Eagles bio

1997 births
Living people
Players of American football from South Carolina
American football placekickers
Georgia Southern Eagles football players
People from Irmo, South Carolina
Buffalo Bills players